Robert David Brooks (born 14 September 1970) is a former English cricketer.  Brooks was a left-handed batsman who fielded as a wicket-keeper.  He was born in Truro, Cornwall.

Brooks made his debut for Oxfordshire in the 1997 Minor Counties Championship against Herefordshire.  Brooks played Minor counties cricket for Oxfordshire from 1997 to 2004, which included 11 Minor Counties Championship matches and 2 MCCA Knockout Trophy matches.  He made his List A debut against Wales Minor Counties in the 2000 NatWest Trophy.  He played his second and final List A match against Huntingdonshire in the 2001 Cheltenham & Gloucester Trophy.  In his 2 List A matches he scored 37 runs at a batting average of 18.50, with a high score of 23.

References

External links

Robert Brooks at ESPNcricinfo
Robert Brooks at CricketArchive

1970 births
Living people
Sportspeople from Truro
English cricketers
Oxfordshire cricketers
Wicket-keepers